John Dixon (born December 1951) is an Australian former rugby league football coach and player. He played during the 1970s and coached the Crusaders RL club of Super League and was also head coach of Wales RL until mid-2009.

Background
John Dixon was born in Toowoomba, Queensland. Australia.

Playing career
Dixon played for Toowoomba (including one game against a touring Great Britain side in 1974) and also had spells in Dalby and Rockhampton. Working as a teacher, he took to coaching when he retired from playing, becoming coach of the Toowoomba Clydesdales and also working for 10 years at the Brisbane Broncos from 1995 in various coaching and development roles under Wayne Bennett. After that he moved to Wales and took on the coaching job at the Celtic Crusaders, who in 2008 won the opportunity to join the Super League competition from 2009. Also in 2008, Dixon was selected as coach of the Wales until succeeded by Iestyn Harris in mid-2009. At the end of 2009's Super League XIV Dixon, who had coached every game of the Celtic Crusaders' four-year history stood down. In 2010 he coached the Redcliffe Dolphins of the Queensland Cup.

Sources
Notes

Bibliography
My Life in Rugby League: John Dixon - Celtic Crusaders - article at totlrl.com
Darren is on the Mapp - article at thisissouthwales.co.uk

Living people
Australian rugby league coaches
Australian rugby league players
Crusaders Rugby League coaches
Rugby league players from Toowoomba
Toowoomba Clydesdales coaches
Wales national rugby league team coaches
Year of birth missing (living people)